The Authion is a  long river in western France located in the departments of Indre-et-Loire (Centre-Val de Loire) and Maine-et-Loire (Pays de la Loire). It is a tributary of the river Loire on the right side. It flows into the Loire in Sainte-Gemmes-sur-Loire, near Angers. Its longest tributaries are the Lathan and the Couasnon. The largest towns on the Authion are Bourgueil, Mazé-Milon, Brain-sur-l'Authion, Trélazé and Les Ponts-de-Cé.

References

Rivers of France
Rivers of Indre-et-Loire
Rivers of Maine-et-Loire
Rivers of Centre-Val de Loire
Rivers of Pays de la Loire